Sir George Gilbert Scott  (13 July 1811 – 27 March 1878), largely known as Sir Gilbert Scott, was a prolific English Gothic Revival architect, chiefly associated with the design, building and renovation of churches and cathedrals, although he started his career as a leading designer of workhouses. Over 800 buildings were designed or altered by him.

Scott was the architect of many iconic buildings, including the Midland Grand Hotel at St Pancras Station, the Albert Memorial, and the Foreign and Commonwealth Office, all in London, St Mary's Cathedral, Glasgow, the main building of the University of Glasgow, St Mary's Cathedral in Edinburgh and King's College Chapel, London.

Life and career
Born in Gawcott, Buckingham, Buckinghamshire, Scott was the son of the Reverend Thomas Scott (1780–1835) and grandson of the biblical commentator Thomas Scott. He studied architecture as a pupil of James Edmeston and, from 1832 to 1834, worked as an assistant to Henry Roberts. He also worked as an assistant for his friend, Sampson Kempthorne, who specialised in the design of workhouses, a field in which Scott was to begin his independent career.

Early work

Scott's first work was built in 1833; it was a vicarage for his father in the village of Wappenham, Northamptonshire. It replaced the previous vicarage occupied by other relatives of Scott. Scott went on to design several other buildings in the village.

In about 1835, Scott took on William Bonython Moffatt as his assistant and later (1838–1845) as his partner. Over ten years or so, Scott and Moffatt designed more than forty workhouses in the wake of the Poor Law Amendment Act 1834. Their first churches were St Mary Magdalene at Flaunden, Bucks (1838, for Samuel King, Scott's uncle); St Nicholas, Newport, Lincoln (1839); St John, Wall, Staffordshire (1839); and the Neo-Norman church of St Peter at Norbiton, Surrey (1841). They built Reading Gaol (1841–42) in a picturesque, castellated style.

Gothic Revival

Meanwhile, he was inspired by Augustus Pugin to participate in the Gothic Revival. While still in partnership with Moffat. he designed the Martyrs' Memorial on St Giles', Oxford (1841), and St Giles' Church, Camberwell (1844), both of which helped establish his reputation within the movement.

Commemorating three Protestants burnt during the reign of Queen Mary, the Martyrs' Memorial was intended as a rebuke to those very high church tendencies which had been instrumental in promoting the new authentic approach to Gothic architecture. St Giles' was in plan, with its long chancel, of the type advocated by the Ecclesiological Society: Charles Locke Eastlake said that "in the neighbourhood of London no church of its time was considered in purer style or more orthodox in its arrangement". It did, however, like many churches of the time, incorporate wooden galleries, not used in medieval churches and highly disapproved of by the high church ecclesiological movement.

In 1844 he received the commission to rebuild the Nikolaikirche in Hamburg (completed 1863), following an international competition. Scott's design had originally been placed third in the competition, the winner being one in a Florentine inspired style by Gottfried Semper, but the decision was overturned by a faction who favoured a Gothic design. Scott's entry had been the only design in the Gothic style.

In 1854 he remodelled the Camden Chapel in Camberwell, a project in which the critic John Ruskin took a close interest and made many suggestions.  He added an apse, in a Byzantine style, integrating it to the existing plain structure by substituting a waggon roof for the existing flat ceiling.

Scott was appointed architect to Westminster Abbey in 1849, and in 1853 he built a Gothic terraced block adjoining the abbey in Broad Sanctuary.  In 1858 he designed ChristChurch Cathedral, Christchurch, New Zealand which now lies partly ruined following the earthquake in 2011 and subsequent attempts by the Anglican Church authorities to demolish it. Demolition was blocked after appeals by the people of Christchurch, and in September 2017 the Christchurch Diocesan Synod announced that the cathedral would be reinstated.

The choir stalls at Lancing College in Sussex, which Scott designed with Walter Tower, were among many examples of his work that incorporated green men.

Later, Scott went beyond copying mediaeval English gothic for his Victorian Gothic or Gothic Revival buildings, and began to introduce features from other styles and European countries as evidenced in his Midland red-brick construction, the Midland Grand Hotel at London's St Pancras Station, from which approach Scott believed a new style might emerge.

In 1863, after restoration of the chapel at Sudeley Castle, the remains of Catherine Parr were placed in a new neo-Gothic canopied tomb designed by Gilbert Scott and created by sculptor John Birnie Philip.

Between 1864 and 1876, the Albert Memorial, designed by Scott, was constructed in Hyde Park. It was a commission on behalf of Queen Victoria in memory of her husband, Prince Albert.

Scott advocated the use of Gothic architecture for secular buildings, rejecting what he called "the absurd supposition that Gothic architecture is exclusively and intrinsically ecclesiastical." He was the winner of a competition to design new buildings in Whitehall to house the Foreign Office and War Office. Before work began, however, the administration which had approved his plans went out of office. Palmerston, the new Prime Minister, objected to Scott's use of the Gothic, and the architect – after some resistance – drew up new plans in a more acceptable style.

Scott designed the memorial to Thomas Clarkson in Wisbech, where his brother Rev John Scott was vicar. The Clarkson Memorial was completed after his death under the direction of his son John in 1881.

Honours
Scott was awarded the RIBA's Royal Gold Medal in 1859. He was appointed an Honorary Liveryman of the Turners' Company; and on 9 August 1872 he was knighted, choosing the style Sir Gilbert Scott. He died in 1878 and is buried in Westminster Abbey.

A London County Council "blue plaque" (in fact brown) was placed in 1910 to mark Scott's residence at the Admiral's House on Admiral's Walk in Hampstead.

Family
Scott married Caroline Oldrid of Boston in 1838. Two of his sons George Gilbert Scott, Jr. (founder of Watts & Company in 1874) and John Oldrid Scott, and his grandson Giles Gilbert Scott, were also prominent architects. His third son, photographer, Albert Henry Scott (1844–65) died at the age of twenty-one; George Gilbert designed his funerary monument in St Peter's Church, Petersham, whilst he was living at The Manor House at Ham in Richmond. His fifth and youngest son was the botanist Dukinfield Henry Scott. He was also great-uncle of the architect Elisabeth Scott.

Pupils

Scott's success attracted a large number of pupils and many would go on to have successful careers of their own, not always as architects. Some notable pupils are as follows, their time in Scott's office shown after their name: Hubert Austin (1868), Joseph Maltby Bignell (1859–78), George Frederick Bodley (1845–56), Charles Buckeridge (1856–57), Somers Clarke (1865), William Henry Crossland (dates uncertain), C. Hodgson Fowler (1856–60), Thomas Garner (1856–61), Thomas Graham Jackson (1858–61), John T. Micklethwaite (1862–69), Benjamin Mountfort (1841–46), John Norton (1870–78), George Gilbert Scott, Jr. (1856–63), John Oldrid Scott (1858–78), J. J. Stevenson (1858–60), George Edmund Street (1844–49), and William White (1845–47).

Books

 online texts for vols. I & II

Additionally he wrote over forty pamphlets and reports. As well as publishing articles, letters, lectures and reports in The Builder, The Ecclesiologist, The Building News, The British Architect, The Civil Engineer's and Architect's Journal, The Illustrated London News, The Times and Transactions of the Royal Institute of British Architects.

Architectural work

His projects include:

Public buildings
Workhouse in Winslow, Buckinghamshire (1835)
Workhouses (1836) in: Amesbury, Wiltshire; Buckingham, Buckinghamshire; Kettering, Northamptonshire; Northampton, Northamptonshire; Oundle, Northamptonshire; Tiverton, Devon; Totnes, Devon; Towcester, Northamptonshire
Workhouse in Guildford, Surrey (1836–38)
Workhouses (1837) in: Bideford, Devon; Boston, Lincolnshire; Clutton, Somerset; Flax Bourton, Somerset; Gloucester, Gloucestershire; Liskeard, Cornwall; Newton Abbot, Devon; Hundleby, Lincolnshire; Tavistock, Devon
The workhouse in Loughborough, Leicestershire (1837–38)
Workhouses (1838) in: Amersham, Buckinghamshire; Belper, Derbyshire; Great Dunmow, Essex; Lichfield, Staffordshire; Mere, Wiltshire; Penzance, Cornwall; Redruth, Cornwall
Workhouse (1838); Williton, Somerset and 'sister design' Witham, Essex
Workhouses (1839) in: Billericay, Essex; Bedworth, Warwickshire; Edmonton, London; Louth, Lincolnshire; Newcastle-under-Lyme, Staffordshire; Old Windsor, Berkshire; St Austell, Cornwall; Uttoxeter, Staffordshire
Buckingham Gaol extension and alterations (1839) in: Buckingham, Buckinghamshire
The workhouse in Lutterworth, Leicestershire (1839–40)
School and Master's House, Hartshill, Stoke on Trent (1840)
Infant Orphan Asylum, Wanstead, Essex (1841–43)
Martyrs' Memorial, Oxford (1841–43)
Reading Gaol, Berkshire (1842–44)
Lunatic Asylum, Shelton, Shropshire (1843)
The workhouse, Macclesfield, Cheshire (1843)
Lunatic Asylum, Clifton, York (1845)
Lunatic Asylum, Wells, Somerset (1845)
Astbury School and Masters House Congleton (1848)
Christ Church School, Alsager, Cheshire (1848)
Brighton College, Sussex (1848–1866)
Sandbach School, Sandbach, Cheshire (1849)
School, Trefnant, Denbighshire (c. 1855)
School, Tysoe, Warwickshire (1856)

Literary Institution, Sandbach (1857)
Crimea War Memorial, Westminster School, Broad Sanctuary, Westminster (1858)
School, Ashley, Northamptonshire (1858)
The Vaughan Library, Harrow School, Middlesex (1861–63)
Foreign and Commonwealth Office, Whitehall, London (1861–1868)
Fitzroy Memorial Library, Lewes, East Sussex (1862)
Preston Town Hall, Lancashire (1862–67), destroyed by fire in 1947

Old Schools, Cambridge (1864–67)
Leeds General Infirmary (1864–67)
The Albert Memorial, London (1864–72); in the podium frieze, one of the images of architects, sculpted by John Birnie Philip shows Scott himself
Midland Grand Hotel, St Pancras Station, London (1865)
McManus Galleries – formerly the Albert Institute, Dundee (1865–69)
The School, Great Dunmow, Essex (1866)

Brill Swimming Baths, Brighton (1866–69), demolished 1929
Clifton Hampden Bridge, Oxfordshire (1867)
The library of the Grammar School (now Hall Cross School) in Doncaster (1868)
Market Cross, Helmsley, Yorkshire (1869)
School Nocton, Lincolnshire (1869)
Extension to Radcliffe Infirmary, Oxford (1869–71)
Lincoln's Inn, London, Library extension (1870–72), New Chambers Block A (1873) and New Chambers Block B (1876–78)
The main building of the new campus of the University of Glasgow (1870), often called the Gilbert Scott Building
Savernake Hospital, Wiltshire (1871–72)
Gatehouse to Ramsgate Cemetery, Kent (1872)
The University Senate Hall, Mumbai University (1869–74)
 The University Library and Rajabai Clock Tower, Mumbai University (1869–78)
The Clarkson Memorial in Wisbech. Scott first put forward designs in 1875, but work did not start until 1880. The eventual design was a slightly altered version of Scott's original design.

Domestic buildings
Vicarage, Wappenham, Northamptonshire (1833)
16 High Street, Chesham, Buckinghamshire (1835)
Vicarage, Dinton, Buckinghamshire (1836)
Rectory, Weston Turville, Buckinghamshire (1838)
Parsonage, Blakesley, Northamptonshire (1839)
Parsonage, Hartshill, Stoke on Trent (1840)
Wanstead Infant Orphanage Asylum, London Borough of Redbridge (1841)
Seaman's Houses, Whitby, Yorkshire (1842)
Workers Houses, Hartshill, Stoke on Trent (1842–48)
Parsonage, Clifton Hampden, Oxfordshire (1843–46)
Parsonage, Barnet, Hertford (1845)
Parsonage, St Mark's, Swindon (c. 1846)
Parsonage, Wembley, Middlesex (1846)
Parsonage, Weeton, North Yorkshire (c. 1852)
Houses Broad Sanctuary, Westminster (1852–54)
Parsonage, St Paul's, Cambridge (1853–54), now Cambridge Muslim College
Parsonage, St Mary's, Stoke Newington, London (c. 1855)
All Souls' Vicarage, Halifax, Yorkshire (c. 1856)
Cottages, Ilam, Staffordshire (c. 1857)
Almshouses, Hartshill, Stoke on Trent (1857)
Lanhydrock House, near Bodmin, Cornwall (1857) an Elizabethan mansion rebuilt after a fire, formal gardens assisted by Richard Coad
Parsonage, Kilkhampton, Cornwall (c. 1858)
The Vicarage, Leafield, Oxfordshire (1858)
Walton Hall, Warwickshire (1858)
Treverbyn Vean, St Neot, Cornwall (1858–62)
Parsonage, Ashley, Northamptonshire (1858)
Claydon House, Buckinghamshire (1859)
Parsonage, Bridge, Kent (c. 1859)
Vicarage, Ranmore Common, Surrey (c. 1859)
Kelham Hall, Nottinghamshire (1859–62)
Workers' housing at Akroydon, Halifax (1859)
Almshouses, Sandbach (1860)
Parsonage, Trefnant, Denbighshire (1860)
Lee Priory, Littlebourne, Kent, alterations and additions (1860–63) demolished
Rectory, Higham, Forest Heath, Suffolk (c. 1861)
Kingston Grange, Kingston St Mary, Somerset for Mr Perkins (c. 1861)
Parsonage, St Andrew's, Leicester (c. 1861)
Hartland Abbey (c.1851) supervised by Richard Coad, built by Pulsman of Barnstaple
Hafodunos, Llangernyw, North Wales (1861–1866)
Vicarage, Jarrom Street, Leicester (1862)
Nos 1,3 & 3a Dean's Yard, Westminster (1862)
Parsonage, Leith, Midlothian (1862)
Brownsover Hall, Warwickshire, date uncertain (c. 1860)
Two lodge houses at Great Barr Hall, near Birmingham (pre-1863)
The Master's House, St John's College, Cambridge (1863)
Parsonage, Christ Church, Ottershaw, Surrey (c. 1864)
Parsonage, St Luke's, Weaste, Lancashire (c. 1865)
Schools Master's House, Ashley, Northamptonshire (1865)
Almshouses, Winchcombe, Gloucestershire (1865)
Rectory, Tydd St Giles, Cambridgeshire (1868)
Vicarage, Higham Green, Suffolk
Parsonage, Mirfield, Yorkshire (1869)
Polwhele House, Truro, Cornwall, additions (c. 1870)
Vicarage, Hillesden, Buckinghamshire (1871)
St Mary's Homes, Godstone (1872)
Scott's Building, King's College, Cambridge (1873)
Parsonage, St Michael's, New Southgate, Middlesex (c. 1874)
Parsonage, St Saviour's, Leicester (1875)
Parsonage, Fulney, Lincolnshire (1877–80)
New Court, Pembroke College, Cambridge (1881)
 Garboldisham Hall, Garboldisham, Norfolk (1822)

Church buildings

St Mark's Church, Ladywood (1840–41) (demolished 1947)
St Giles' Church, Camberwell, London (1841–44)
Christ Church, Bridlington (1840–41)
St Mary's Church, Hanwell, Middlesex (1841)
Holy Trinity, Hulme (1841)
St Peter's Church, Norbiton, Surrey (1841)
Holy Trinity Church, Hartshill, Stoke on Trent (1842)
St John the Baptist's Church, St John's, Woking, Surrey (1842)
St John the Baptist Church, Beeston, Nottinghamshire (1842)
St Michael and All Angels Church, Wood Green (1843)
St John the Baptist's Church, Leenside, Nottingham (1843–44)
Holy Trinity Church, Halstead, Essex (1843–44)
St John the Evangelist, West Meon, Hampshire (1843–46), squared knapped flint work
St Mark's Church, Worsley, Greater Manchester (1844–46)
St John the Evangelist, Wembley, Middlesex (1846)
St Matthias, Malvern Link, Worcestershire (1844–46)
St Mark's Church, Swindon (1845)
St Matthew’s Church, Donnington Wood, Telford, Shropshire (1845)
St Nikolai, Hamburg (1845–80), the tallest building in the world from 1874 to 1876.
 Memorial Chapel, Bromsgrove School
The Cathedral of St John the Baptist in St John's, Newfoundland (1847, construction overseen by apprentice William Hay)
St Mary the Virgin, Aylesbury (1848)
St Gregory's Church, Canterbury (1848)
St Paul's Church, Canterbury (1848)
St Cwyfan, Tudweiliog, Gwynedd (1849)
St Peter's Church, South Croydon (1851)
Emmanuel Church, Forest Gate, London (1852)
St John's Church, Eastnor, Herefordshire Church (1852) and Monument (1855)
All Saints' Church, Watford, Hertfordshire (1853)
St Paul's Episcopal Cathedral, Dundee (1853) (cathedral since 1905)
St Mary's Church, West Derby, Liverpool (1853–6)
All Saints' Church, Sherbourne, Warwick (1854)
Christ Church, Lee Park, Kent (1854) (bombed 1941, demolished 1944)
St John the Evangelist, Shirley, Surrey (1854)
Holy Trinity Church, Coventry (1854)
St Paul's Church, Chippenham (1854–55)
Chapel of Exeter College, Oxford (1854–60)
Holy Trinity Church, Trefnant (1855)
St John's Church, Bilton, Harrogate (1855)
St Mary, Hayes, Kent (alterations) (1856–62)
St Peter, Bushley, Worcestershire. Roof (1856)
St Mary, Tedstone Delamere, Herefordshire Chancel (1856–57)
St George's Minster, Doncaster (1858)
 St Mary New Church, Stoke Newington (1858)
St Matthias Church, Richmond, London (1858)
All Souls Church, Halifax (1859)
St Thomas's Church, Huddersfield (1859)
St Michael and All Angels Church, Leafield, Oxfordshire (1859–60)
St Matthew's Church, Stretton, Cheshire (1859 and 1867)
St Matthew's Church, Yiewsley, Hillingdon (1859)
St Mary, Edvin Loach, Herefordshire (?1860)
Christ Church, Wanstead, Essex (1861)
St Stephen's Church, Higham Green, Suffolk (1861)
St John the Evangelist, Sandbach Heath (1861)
All Saints' Church, Hawkhurst, Kent (1861)
St Andrews, Jarrom Street, Leicester (1862)
The Hereford Screen (1862), choir screen from Hereford Cathedral, now restored and in the Victoria and Albert Museum, London
Chapel of Wellington College, Berkshire (1861–63)
All Saints' Church, Langton Green, Kent (1862–63)
St Barnabas' Church, Bromborough, Merseyside (1862–64)
St Andrew's Hospital Chapel, Northampton (1863)
St John the Evangelist, Taunton (1863)
St Clement's Church, Barnsbury (1864–65) (closed 1976 and converted into flats)
St Andrew's Church, Derby (1864–67)
St Andrew's Church, Uxbridge (1865)
St John the Baptist, Penshurst (1865)
St Luke's Church, Pendleton (1865)
St Stephen & St Mark, Lewisham (1865)
St Mary's Church, Shackleford, Surrey (1865)
St Denys Church, Southampton (1868)
St Stephen's Church, Higham Green, Suffolk (1868)
St James' Church, Cradley, Herefordshire Chancel (1868)
Holy Trinity Church, Shanghai (1866–69)
St Peter's Church, Edensor, Derbyshire (1867–70)
St Mary's Church, Mirfield (1869-1871)
Ramsgate Cemetery Chapel, Kent (1869)
All Saints' church, Ryde, Isle of Wight (1872)
St Thomas of Canterbury Church, Chester (1872)
St Peter and St Paul, Priory Church Leominster, Herefordshire Quatrefoil piers (1872–79).
The Cathedral Church of St Mary the Virgin, Glasgow (1873)
Christ Church, Bradford-on-Avon (additions) (1875)
St Saviour's Church, Leicester (1875–77)
All Souls, Blackman Lane, Leeds (1879) – his last work, a large lancet-style church
St Mary The Virgin, Speldhurst Kent (1879)
St Michael and St George Cathedral, Grahamstown (tower and spire completed in 1879)
St Paul's Church, Low Fulney, Spalding, Lincolnshire (completed 1880)
St Michael, Stourport-on-Severn, Worcestershire: designed (1875), started (1881) by son John Oldrid Scott, never finished and partly demolished
ChristChurch Cathedral, Christchurch, New Zealand

St John The Baptist Church, Busbridge, Godalming, Surrey
St Mary's Cathedral, Edinburgh (Episcopal)
St Mary's Church, Mirfield, West Yorkshire
St Mary, Timsbury, Somerset
St Nicholas's, Newport, Lincoln, Lincolnshire
St Peter's Church, Elworth, Cheshire
Christ The Saviour, Ealing, London
Christ Church, Ramsgate, Kent
Christ Church, Swindon, Wiltshire

Restorations

Churches
Scott was involved in major restorations of medieval church architecture, all across England.
 Church of St Peter and St Paul, Buckingham, Buckinghamshire
 All Saints' Church, Hillesden, Buckinghamshire (1874–75)
 Church of St Mary the Less, Cambridge, Cambridgeshire (1856–57)
St John the Baptist Church, Upton Bishop, Herefordshire (1862)
 St Mary's Church, Halton, Cheshire (1852)
 St Peter's Church, Prestbury, Cheshire (1879–1881)
 St Mary's Church, Sandbach, Cheshire (1847)
 St Cuthbert's Church, Darlington, County Durham (1864-5)
 Church of St Mary and All Saints, Chesterfield, Derbyshire (1843)
 Church of St John the Baptist, Danbury, Essex (1866–67)
 St Mary Abbots, Kensington, Greater London (1872)
 St Margaret's Church, Westminster, Greater London (1877–78)
 Church of St John the Baptist, Aconbury, Herefordshire (1863)
 St Leonard's Church, Yarpole, Herefordshire (1864)
 St Mary's Church, Bishopsbourne, Kent (1871)
 St Paul's Church, Canterbury, Kent (1860s)
 St Wulfram's Church, Grantham, Lincolnshire (1866–75)
 All Saints' Church, Winterton, Lincolnshire (1867)
 Church of St Mary and St Nicholas, Spalding, Lincolnshire (1865-7)
 All Saints' Church, East Winch, Norfolk
 St Margaret's Church, King's Lynn, Norfolk (1875)
 St Peter's Church, Northampton, Northamptonshire (1849-1851)
 St Andrew's Church, Spratton, Northamptonshire (1847)
 Church of St Mary Magdalene, Newark-on-Trent, Nottinghamshire (1850s)
 St Mary's Church, Nottingham, Nottinghamshire (1850s)
 Church of St Mary Magdalene, Duns Tew, Oxfordshire (1861–62)
 All Saints' Church, Oakham, Rutland (1857–1858)
 Church of St John the Baptist, Glastonbury, Somerset (1850s)
 Church of St Mary, Orchardleigh, Somerset (1878)
 Church of St Editha, Tamworth, Staffordshire (1850s)
 St Mary's Church, Temple Balsall, Warwickshire (1849) 
 Church of St John the Baptist, Bromsgrove, Worcestershire (1858)
 St Mary's Church, Kingston upon Hull, East Riding of Yorkshire (1861–63)
 Chantry Chapel of St Mary the Virgin, Wakefield, West Yorkshire (1842)

Cathedrals
Ely Cathedral (1847–78)
Gloucester Cathedral (1854–76)
Peterborough Cathedral (1855–60)
Coventry Cathedral (1855–57)
Hereford Cathedral east side (1855–63)
Lichfield Cathedral (1855–61 & 1877–81)
Wakefield Cathedral (1858–60, 1865–69 and 1872–74)
Durham Cathedral (1859 and 1874–76)
Brecon Cathedral (1860–62 & 1872–75)
Canterbury Cathedral (1860 & 1877–80)
Chichester Cathedral (1861–67 & 1872)
Ripon Cathedral (1862–72)
St Edmundsbury Cathedral (1863–64 & 1867–69)
Worcester Cathedral (1863–64, 1868 & 1874)
St David's Cathedral, St Davids, Wales (1864–76)
Salisbury Cathedral (1865–71)
St Asaph Cathedral (1866–69 & 1871)
Newcastle Cathedral (1867–71 & 1872–76)
Chester Cathedral (1868–75)
Exeter Cathedral (1869–70)
Christ Church, Oxford east wall of choir (1870–72 & 1874–76)
Rochester Cathedral (1871–74)
St Albans Cathedral (1871–80)
Manchester Cathedral (c. 1872)
Winchester Cathedral (1875)
Additionally, Scott designed the Mason and Dixon monument in York Minster (1860), prepared plans for the restoration of Bristol Cathedral in 1859 and Norwich Cathedral in 1860 neither of which resulted in a commission, and designed a pulpit for Lincoln Cathedral in 1863.

Abbeys, priories and collegiate churches
St Mary's Church, Stafford, 1842–45
Beverley Minster 1844, 1866–68, 1877
Westminster Abbey, 1848–78
Dorchester Abbey, 1858, 1862, 1874
King's College, Cambridge, 1859–63, 1875
Bath Abbey, 1860–77
Pershore Abbey, 1861–64, 1867
St George's Chapel, Windsor Castle, 1863
Chapel of St James the Great, Lord Leycester Hospital, Warwick, 1863
Great Malvern Priory, c. 1864
Boxgrove Priory, 1864–67
Priory Church, Leominster, 1864–66, 1876–78
Monkwearmouth-Jarrow Abbey, 1865–66
Selby Abbey, 1872–74
Tewkesbury Abbey, 1874–79
Bridlington Priory, 1875–80

Other restoration work
Scott restored the Inner Gateway (also known as the Abbey Gateway) of Reading Abbey in 1860–61 after its partial collapse. St Mary's of Charity in Faversham, which was restored (and transformed, with an unusual spire and unexpected interior) by Scott in 1874, and Dundee Parish Church, and designed the chapels of Exeter College, Oxford, St John's College, Cambridge and King's College, London. He also designed St Paul's Cathedral, Dundee.

Lichfield Cathedral's ornate West Front was extensively renovated by Scott from 1855 to 1878. He restored the cathedral to the form he believed it took in the Middle Ages, working with original materials where possible and creating imitations when the originals were not available. It is recognised as some of his finest work.

In 1854 Gilbert Scott began a restoration of Sudeley Castle "working on the western side of the inner court in the style of the existing Medieval and Elizabethan buildings" and subsequently began the restoration of St Mary's chapel, with the assistance of John Drayton Wyatt.

Gallery of architectural work

See also
List of works by George Gilbert Scott

References

Sources

External links

 
 
 
 St Johns Church Bromsgrove 
 Sir George Gilbert Scott, the unsung hero of British architecture
 Profile on Royal Academy of Arts Collections

1811 births
1878 deaths
Architects from Buckinghamshire
English Anglicans
19th-century English architects
English ecclesiastical architects
Gothic Revival architects
Burials at Westminster Abbey
Knights Bachelor
Recipients of the Royal Gold Medal
George Gilbert
Architects of cathedrals
Presidents of the Royal Institute of British Architects
Royal Academicians